Laosaphaenops deharvengi is a species of beetle in the family Carabidae, the only species in the genus Laosaphaenops.

References

Trechinae